Yellow Head is a small coastal village in the Lincoln County, in the US state of Maine. It is located on Pemaquid peninsula, 1.1 nm south of New Harbor, Maine and north of Pemaquid Lighthouse.

Villages in Maine
Villages in Lincoln County, Maine
Populated coastal places in Maine